Smart Move or Smart Moves may refer to:

 Smart Move (FIRST), the 2009-10 FIRST Lego League challenge
 SmartMove, part of Corel Linux
 Smart Moves, a book by Carla Hannaford
 "Smart Move", a feature of Logitech’s Mouseware
 "Smart Move", an episode of the American sitcom Friends and Lovers
 SmartMove, a credit-check service offered by TransUnion
 Smart Moves, a 1986 novel by Stuart M. Kaminsky
 Smart Moves, a 1986 jazz album by Harvie S

See also
 Smartmovie, a mobile multimedia application